Gerald Michael Edmonton (born Gerald McCrohan, October 24, 1946 – November 28, 1993) was a Canadian-American musician who was the drummer, and secondary lead vocalist for the rock band Steppenwolf.

Early life and career 
Edmonton was born in Oshawa, Ontario, Canada. Both his brother Dennis, also known as Mars Bonfire, and he changed their surnames to Edmonton during the 1960s, when they performed in a group called The Sparrows. John Kay and Goldy McJohn joined this group in Toronto in 1965 and, after some more changes in personnel and relocating to California, the group was renamed Steppenwolf.

When Steppenwolf temporarily broke up on February 14, 1972, Edmonton and Steppenwolf organist Goldy McJohn formed the band Seven with singer Lance Gullickson and guitarist Robin Huff.  After Seven, Edmonton, and McJohn formed Manbeast with Rod Prince and Roy Cox of Bubble Puppy before Steppenwolf reconvened in 1974 for three albums before breaking up again in 1976.

Personal life 
Edmonton married former Steppenwolf bandmate Andy Chapin's widow in the 1980s. Edmonton died in a car accident, crashing into a tree after failing to manoeuvre a turn, in Santa Ynez, California, on November 28, 1993.

Discography 

Singles

References

External Links
 
 

1946 births
1993 deaths
Musicians from Oshawa
Canadian rock drummers
Canadian male drummers
Road incident deaths in California
Steppenwolf (band) members
20th-century Canadian drummers
20th-century Canadian male musicians